Rapid Penang (styled as rapidPenang) is a public bus brand in the State of Penang, Malaysia. Formed as a subsidiary of Prasarana Malaysia in 2007, to date it is the main public transport operator within Penang; its bus network serves commuters within Greater Penang, including the neighbouring towns in Kedah and Perak.

Rapid Penang was the second public transportation firm established by Prasarana Malaysia, a corporate body owned by the Malaysian federal government to manage urban public transportation. The first was Rapid KL in 2004, which now encompasses public bus, LRT and monorail services within Kuala Lumpur and the greater Klang Valley. Thus, similar to Rapid KL, Rapid Penang's bus fleet is under the management of Rapid Bus Sdn Bhd.

History
Originally, the public bus service in Penang were fragmented and disorganised, with several local public bus operators facing financial difficulties and showing signs of collapse. This situation reached a critical point when the Yellow Bus Company, one of the largest public bus operators in Penang with a 58-year history, suddenly ceased operations in 2004, leaving thousands of commuters stranded.

The Penang state government at the time under the then Chief Minister, Koh Tsu Koon attempted to revamp the state's ailing bus network. Under the revamped routes that were launched in 2006, bigger buses were made to run along trunk routes while minibuses ran feeder routes which branched off the trunk routes. The revamp, however, failed to improve the situation, leading the Penang state government to study the revamp already conducted in Kuala Lumpur and request for federal intervention. It was felt that bringing in Rapid KL, which already had the expertise and know-how, was the better solution than simply purchasing more buses, although Rapid KL at the time chose to focus on its core operations in the Klang Valley.

In 2007, Koh announced that the federal government agreed to operate a bus service in the state. Prasarana Malaysia, which until then had been running Rapid KL services within the Klang Valley, was appointed to implement a similar system for Penang, as well as to handle the procurement of the required assets. To this end, Prasarana set up Rapid Penang, which was registered under Malaysia's Ministry of Finance. Rapid Penang formally commenced operations on 31 July 2007.

Initially, the remaining local public bus operators were allowed to resume their operations to complement Rapid Penang. However, since then, these local companies have ceased operations. Rapid Penang has become the main and only public bus provider in the state.

Routes

, Rapid Penang has a total of 56 routes and a few shuttle routes throughout Greater Penang, which also includes routes into neighbouring Kedah and Perak. These routes also include the free-of-charge services within George Town's UNESCO World Heritage Site.

30 of these routes are within Penang Island, while 19 are within Seberang Perai, the mainland halve of Penang. Rapid Penang also operates three cross-strait routes between Bayan Lepas on Penang Island and Seberang Perai, also known as BEST (Bridge Express Shuttle Transit) routes, catering specifically to factory workers who commute daily to the Bayan Lepas Free Industrial Zone. In addition, Rapid Penang has five cross-border interstate routes from within Seberang Perai into Kedah and Perak.

Fares

Concession fares are granted for certain categories of passengers, such as senior citizens(over 60 years old), and children below 12.

Fleet
, Rapid Penang's fleet consists of 406 buses. As with other Prasarana brands such as Rapid KL and Rapid Kuantan, Rapid Penang's bus fleet is managed under Rapid Bus.

Rapid ICIS
Rapid ICIS, an acronym for Rapid Penang Intelligent Commuter Information System, was launched in 2010 to provide passengers with real-time information regarding the arrival times of buses to various destinations. The data, which comes from the GPS tracking devices installed on every bus, is relayed to the Rapid ICIS Displays located at most bus stops.

In addition, this information is relayed via the Rapid Penang iPlanner application (only available for iOS-enabled Apple smartphones), Rapid Penang's official website, and the LED screens installed at most bus stops allowing commuters to plan their bus trips while on the move.

The ICIS Centre, which serves as the company's integrated command centre, is located at Rapid Penang's headquarters at Lorong Kulit, George Town.

See also
 Penang Hop-On Hop-Off

 Prasarana Malaysia Berhad
 Rapid Ferry Sdn Bhd
 Rapid Bus Sdn Bhd
 Rapid KL
  BRT Sunway Line
  BRT Federal Line
 Rapid Kuantan

References

External links 
 

Transport in Penang
Bus transport in Malaysia
Northern Corridor Economic Region
Malaysian brands
2007 establishments in Malaysia